Zvjezdan Misimović (born 5 June 1982) is a Bosnian former professional footballer who most notably played for Bayern Munich, VfL Wolfsburg, Galatasaray, Dynamo Moscow, and Beijing Renhe as an attacking midfielder. Misimović is the fourth most capped player in the history of the Bosnia and Herzegovina national team, capped 84 times. His 25 international goals also makes him his country's third top-goalscorer. He represented Bosnia and Herzegovina at 2014 FIFA World Cup.

Currently, Misimović is employed as an official at the Football Association of Bosnia and Herzegovina, and performs duties of the Director of the Bosnia and Herzegovina national football team.

Prior to joining Dynamo Moscow, Misimović made a name for himself while playing for VfL Wolfsburg, with whom he won the Bundesliga in the 2008–09 season. In the same season, he accomplished 20 assists, which was the most in that season.

Early life
Misimović was born to a family of Bosnian Serb gastarbeiters who had come to West Germany from Bosanska Gradiška during the late 1960s.

Club career

Early career
Known in Germany as Zwetschge (a German plum) due to similar pronunciation to his first name, Misimović was a product of Bayern Munich youth academy. He played for four years with the club's reserve team, collecting 44 goals in 102 appearances. In the 2003–04 Regionalliga season, Misimović scored 21 goals, a personal best, finishing the league as top goalscorer jointly with Paolo Guerrero, his teammate. His first and only hat-trick on club level came in a 5–1 win over SC Pfullendorf on 2 November. Bayern II won the championship, but since being a reserve side, were barred from promotion, thus allowing 1. FC Saarbrücken to be promoted to the 2004–05 2. Bundesliga.

During this time, he was able to play five times for the main squad. His senior debut occurred on 12 April 2003 in a 0–1 loss to Werder Bremen, match valid for the 28th week of 2002–03 Bundesliga; he entered the match as a 78-minute substitute, replacing fellow midfielder Bastian Schweinsteiger.

Misimović joined VfL Bochum at the start of the 2004–05 season. He left the club at the end of 2007–08 season after his contract expired, while his move to 1. FC Nürnberg was announced in January 2007.

Misimović signed for 1. FC Nürnberg in July 2007, immediately becoming one of the most important players in the squad. He made his first appearance of the season in the opening championship week against Karlsruher SC. Later on 15 September, he opened his scoring account by netting his side's first goal in an eventual 2–2 home draw against Hannover 96. In January of the following year, he suffered a groin injury, but was recovered back in time for the start of the second part of the season. However, in February, he was injured again, this time in his ankle ligament, which kept him sidelined for the 2007–08 UEFA Cup round of 32 tie against Benfica; without him, Nürnberg lost 3–2 on aggregate and was eliminated from the competition. It was a breakthrough season for Misimović, who scored ten league goals in 28 appearances, earning him a transfer to VfL Wolfsburg.

VfL Wolfsburg

Misimović completed a transfer to fellow Bundesliga side VfL Wolfsburg in June 2008 for €3.9 million, with the move becoming official on 1 July. He signed a contract until June 2012 and took squad number 10 for the 2008–09 season.

Misimović made his official debut for the team on 16 August in the opening league match against 1. FC Köln, scoring the winning goal in the 78th minute for a 2–1 win at home. In October, he scored a brace in a 4–1 win over Arminia Bielefeld in his 100th Bundesliga appearance. Together with fellow Bosnian international Edin Džeko and Brazilian striker Grafite, they formed "the magic triangle". He played 33 matches during the season, all of them as starter, being instrumental for Wolfsburg who its first ever Bundesliga title. Misimović scored seven league goals, and also achieved 20 assists for the club, which was the record number of assists in one Bundesliga season, until Kevin De Bruyne surpassed it with one assist more, also while playing for Wolfsburg as well, in the 2014–15 season. In DFB-Pokal, Misimović played four matches as his side was knocked out in quarter-finals by Werder Bremen, while in UEFA Cup, he contributed with eight matches and four goals, including a brace against Braga in group stage, as Wolfsburg was eliminated in knockout stage.

On 4 August 2009, Misimović outstanding performances were rewarded with a new deal until 2013. He commented the renewal, stating the he "feels at home" at Wolfsburg". Later in September, Misimović made his UEFA Champions League debut by playing full-90 minutes in a 3–1 home win versus Russia's PFC CSKA Moscow in the first match of group stage. He played in all group matches, but Wolfsburg didn't go more than the 3rd place, thus getting relegated to UEFA Europa League. His only goal in the competition came on 3 November against Beşiktaş, netting the opener and then setting the third scored by Džeko in a 3–0 win at Vodafone Park. In December, Misimović was one of the four Wolfsburg players to be nominated for 2009 UEFA Team of the Year, but did not made the final list. In UEFA Europa League, he scored his only goal in a round of 16 tie against Rubin Kazan in an eventual quarter-final exit.

In the championship, despite Wolfsburg's failure to retain the title, Misimović continued with his excellent performances, recording 15 assists, two short of Mesut Özil. He also bagged 10 goals, equaling his personal best in top flight first set with Nürnberg in 2007–08 season. For the 2010–11 season, the arrival of playmaker Diego made Misimović's future at the club uncertain. Despite appearing in the 2–1 away defeat to Bayern Munich in season's opener, he left the club in the last day of summer transfer window, opting to join Galatasaray S.K. in Turkey.

Misimović concluded his two-year spell at Wolfsburg by making 92 appearances in all competitions and scoring 25 goals.

Galatasaray
On 31 August 2010, Galatasaray announced that Misimović had joined the team on a four-year contract for a sum of €7 million. He played his first match for the team on 13 September against Gaziantepspor. Despite initially becoming an undisputed starter, on 18 November 2010, Misimović was consigned to the reserve squad, as the head coach Gheorghe Hagi stated that he "didn't need him in the squad". He left the club in March 2011 after a disappointing spell, having made only nine appearances.

Dynamo Moscow
On 3 March 2011, Misimović signed for Russian club Dynamo Moscow in a deal thought to be worth €4.5 million. The deal was until 2014. Before leaving Galatasaray, Misimović called coach Gheorghe Hagi "a liar", but added that he wished his former club all the best. 

Misimović made his competitive debut for the team on 12 March 2011 in a league match against Lokomotiv Moscow, while his first goal came in the next match against Rostov, netting a penalty kick in a 3–1 home win.

Misimović concluded his first season in Russia by scoring ten goals in all competitions; he scored eight goals in league, including the winner against CSKA Moscow in April 2012. In 2011–12 Russian Cup, he scored the lone goal of the quarter-final match against Zenit Saint Petersburg, before scoring the winner in the semi-final against Volga Nizhny Novgorod, sending his team to the final. Both goals came in the same manner – from penalty kicks in the 73rd minute. In the final, Misimović played for 82 minutes, but Dynamo was defeated 1–0 by Rubin Kazan.

Guizhou Renhe
On 4 January 2013, Misimović signed a contract for three years with his new club. Between 22 March and 3 April 2013, Misimović played three games on three continents.

In March 2015, Misimović announced that he would retire from professional football, aged 32. However, he made his return to Guizhou Renhe in June 2015. He announced his retirement again on 8 January 2017.

International career

Youth
Misimović made the FR Yugoslavia under-18 national squad at the 2001 UEFA European Under-18 Football Championship in Finland. Playing alongside seventeen-year-old Dejan Milovanović as well as eighteen-year-olds Nenad Milijaš, Danko Lazović, and Aleksandar Luković who would go on to become established players in their own right, nineteen-year-old Misimović scored twice at the tournament: the winning goal in the group stage match versus Ukraine as well as against the host country Finland.

Misimović later progressed to the FR Yugoslavia under-21 national team, but appeared in only one match as an 85th-minute substitute against France in November 2002. The under-21s head coach Vladimir Petrović Pižon soon dropped Misimović, reportedly telling the young player he was "overweight and slow".

Senior
By late 2003 and early 2004, twenty-one-year-old Misimović still hadn't made an appearance in any national team's full squad. Approached in the Bayern Munich gym by club teammate Hasan Salihamidžić about playing for Bosnia and Herzegovina national team, Misimović was reportedly receptive to the idea immediately. After being put in touch with the Football Association of Bosnia and Herzegovina (N/FSBiH) officials Ahmet Pašalić and Munib Ušanović, the young creative midfielder's attachment to the team was agreed. 

He debuted for Bosnia under head coach Blaž Slišković on 18 February 2004 in a friendly match against Macedonia in Skopje. About a month later, in another friendly, versus Luxembourg in late March 2004, he netted his first goal.

2006 World Cup qualification
From fall 2004, VfL Bochum midfielder Misimović was used sparingly by Slišković during the 2006 FIFA World Cup qualifying campaign that saw Bosnia take on Spain, Serbia and Montenegro, Belgium, Lithuania, and San Marino. He played the full 90 minutes in the opening home draws against Spain and Serbia and Montenegro, followed by a substitute appearance in the away loss to Belgium. 

Misimović then enjoyed a spell as a consistent starter before being subbed off 10–20 minutes into the second half: in the 1–1 home draw with Lithuania (scored the opening goal), the away win at San Marino, and finally the 1–1 draw against Spain in Valencia (again scored the opening goal before Spain tied deep into injury-time in the 96th minute). 

For the deciding four qualifiers during late summer and early fall 2005 (home win against Belgium, the away win at Lithuania, home victory over San Marino, and the away defeat to Serbia and Montenegro), Slišković dropped Misimović (still playing his club football with Bochum but in 2. Bundesliga) to the bench, bringing him into action only in the final 15–20 minutes of each tie.

Euro 2008 qualifying
UEFA Euro 2008 qualifying began in fall 2006 with Slišković still the team's head coach and 24-year-old Misimović an established starter and goalscorer. The opening match dismantling of Malta was followed by the shocking 1–3 defeat to Hungary at home that prompted Slišković's resignation, which the coach retracted a couple of weeks later and stayed on. Still, more disappointment was to follow with a 2–2 draw at lowly Moldova, as Misimović sparked a comeback that ultimately fell short by scoring a goal at 2–0 down. Four days later, Bosnia were heavily defeated 0–4 by Greece at home, forcing Slišković to resign for the second time in three months – this time for good.

As the winter break in qualifying commenced, the Bosnian team was in crisis mode with relations inside the organization strained to the maximum. The turmoil led to thirteen Bosnian national team players (Misimović, Džemal Berberović, Vladan Grujić, Mladen Bartolović, Mirko Hrgović, Zlatan Bajramović, Saša Papac, Emir Spahić, Ninoslav Milenković, Ivica Grlić, Mirsad Bešlija, Kenan Hasagić and Almir Tolja) releasing what was reported as a "signed joint statement in protest". Published in the Dnevni Avaz daily in late October 2006 as a press release, the statement announces the players' intention to boycott national team matches until four N/FSBiH officials—Milan Jelić, Iljo Dominković, Sulejman Čolaković, and Ahmet Pašalić—resign their respective posts. 

Some two months later, in late December 2006, new head coach Fuad Muzurović was announced. In relation to the boycott statement, Misimović soon did a complete turnaround, denying that he ever signed any such paper and stating that his relations with the N/FSBiH had always been amicable.

Under new head coach Muzurović, Misimović truly came into his own, earning the national team captaincy.

Six months under Meho Kodro and four-day national team retirement
After Meho Kodro replaced Muzurović as head coach in early January 2008, one of the changes he introduced was stripping Misimović of the captain's armband and handing it to twenty-seven-year-old defender Emir Spahić who had just returned to the national team having boycotted it since the infamous fall 2006 protest letter. 

On 8 April 2008, a few months into Kodro's tenure, still twenty-five-year-old Misimović announced his retirement from the national team, citing "health concerns" as he no longer felt able to "keep up with the physical rigours of playing for both club and country". However, many immediately began speculating that health had little to do with Misimović's sudden announcement. These suspicions were seemingly confirmed two days later by Bosnian national team general manager Elvir Bolić who hinted that Misimović might have softened his original stance and revealed that head coach Meho Kodro would travel to Germany to visit the player personally and discuss the "real reasons" for his decision. On 12 April 2008, after speaking to Kodro, Misimović changed his mind and the N/FSBiH announced that the player had decided to continue his international career.

2010 World Cup qualification
Under the next head coach Ćiro Blažević during 2010 World Cup qualification process, Misimović asserted himself as the team's undisputed leader on the pitch, displaying great playmaking abilities and leadership qualities. His fine performances began with a hat-trick in a 7–0 victory over Estonia on 10 September 2008. Bosnia finished the group in second place thus qualifying for the playoffs against Portugal in November 2009.

However, the qualifying campaign ended on a sour note both for Misimović personally and for the team. Misimović had a poor outing in the first leg away in Lisbon and was widely criticized for his sub-par performance, even by head coach Blažević who publicly blasted the midfield creator for lack of contribution. The coach especially scolded him for two instances of losing possession in the middle of the pitch that resulted in respective Elvir Rahimić and Emir Spahić defensive tackles in order to prevent a Portuguese counterattack, both of which led to yellow cards that meant an automatic one-match suspension for each player for the return leg. Two days after the first leg (and two days before the 18 November 2009 return leg in Zenica), Misimović was ruled out by medical staff due to a knee injury he had apparently picked up during the first leg.

Controversy arose three days later on 21 November 2009 when he played the full 90 minutes for VfL Wolfsburg in the Bundesliga versus Nürnberg, leading to veiled accusations in the Bosnian media that he faked the injury to get back at Blažević. Head coach Blažević went further, directly accusing Misimović of sabotaging him. Blažević even went as far as alluding to Misimović's Serb ethnicity; suggesting a conspiracy "on instructions from the Republika Srpska Prime Minister Milorad Dodik and Serbian lobby because Republika Srpska would lose everything if Bosnia qualified for World Cup". When informed of Blažević's comments, a stunned Misimović responded that he would not play for Bosnia and Herzegovina as long as Blažević remained the head coach, and further accused Blažević of scapegoating him in order to deflect attention from the fact that the team was thoroughly outplayed by Portugal in both matches. Even though he had already stated his intention to leave the post even before Misimović's latest words, Blažević responded by reiterating he would leave because "Misimović is more important to this team than I am". The next day, Blažević suddenly announced that he had supposedly resolved his differences with the player after apparently calling to congratulate the birth of his son, but this reconciliation was denied by Misimović two weeks later.

Blažević even announced his intent to travel to Wolfsburg for the Champions League group stage match between VfL Wolfsburg and Manchester United in order to visit Misimović personally, but ended up not doing so. Within days, Blažević resigned the Bosnia-Herzegovina head coaching post, revealing that he took an offer from China, and in his parting shot once again singled out Misimović as the "reason why Bosnia did not qualify for the 2010 World Cup".

Euro 2012 qualifying
Misimović played his 51st match for the national team against Luxembourg in September 2010, thereby equaling Elvir Bolić's record for most caps for Bosnia. Misimović surpassed Bolić in a match against France in Sarajevo on 7 September, making him the most capped player in the history of the national team with 52 matches played. Bosnia failed to qualify for Euro 2012 after losing a two-legged playoff against Portugal. Misimović scored a goal from a penalty kick in Lisbon.

2014 World Cup

Misimović made two assists for Edin Džeko in a victory over Greece in Zenica. Local media compared this situation to the way they played together in VfL Wolfsburg. His penalty kick against Greece was saved by goalkeeper Orestis Karnezis, but teammate Vedad Ibišević managed to convert the rebound for a score of 3–0 (final score was 3–1 in stoppage time). Bosnia went on to qualify for the first finals tournament as an independent nation after topping their group on goal difference, and head-to-head.

Misimović and Bosnia faced Argentina in the first match of the world cup. Almost three minutes into the game, a free kick from Lionel Messi flicked on by Marcos Rojo, was deflected into the net for an own goal by Sead Kolašinac. It was the fastest own goal in the history of the World Cup. In the next half, Messi scored from the edge of the penalty area, tucking the ball into the bottom-right corner. Misimović was substituted 11 minutes later. With five minutes of the match remaining, Ibišević scored after a pass from Senad Lulić, which was Bosnia's first ever World Cup-goal. The match ended 2–1.

In the next deciding match, against Nigeria, Misimović played the on the pitch for the entire match. A goal from Džeko was controversially deemed offside, as replays seemed to show that his goal should have stood. Instead, Nigeria took the lead in the 29th minute with a goal from Peter Odemwingie. Bosnia pushed on for the equalizer, and a shot from Džeko was deflected onto the post by Nigerian goalkeeper Vincent Enyeama in stoppage time. Nigeria won the match, which effectively eliminated Bosnia from the tournament with a match to spare. Misimović was dropped for the last match against Iran, and Bosnia went on to earn their first ever win in a World Cup tournament.

In August 2014, following his first and only World Cup, Misimović announced his retirement from international football. On 28 May 2018, he and teammates Vedad Ibišević and Emir Spahić played their farewell match for Bosnia and Herzegovina, a friendly against Montenegro which ended in a 0–0 draw; this was also Misimović's final display in the professional game.

Post-playing career
Zvjezdan Misimović currently performs duties of the director of the Bosnia and Herzegovina national football team. He was elected for the office and took up the position on 10 January 2017.

Personal life
Misimović is an ethnic Serb, and an Orthodox Christian. His nicknames are Miske, and Zwetschge ("plum"). His favourite team is Red Star Belgrade, a team which he has said he would love to retire in.

Misimović's wife, Štefanija, is from Strumica, North Macedonia. The couple have three sons together: Luka (born 2004), Niko (born 2009) and Noel (born 2013).

Career statistics

Club

International

International goals
Misimović has scored 25 goals as of last international match day. On the Bosnian and Herzegovinian football association page it says 26 goals which is incorrect. For the game Bosnia vs Turkey during qualifiers for UEFA EURO 2008, the website shows (see ref link at date 2 June 2007) that Misimović scored a goal, but in fact it was his teammate Muslimović who scored, as Misimović was not a scorer in that game. He has also played one extra game due to a duplication error on the website of the same match. In addition, Misimović did not score a goal against Lithuania on 30 March 2005, rather it was his teammate Elvir Bolić with shirt number 7. This note should remain active until Nogometni/Fudbalski Savez Bosne i Hercegovine (Football Federation of Bosnia and Herzegovina) correct their mistake. 

Scores and results list Bosnia and Herzegovina's goal tally first, score column indicates score after each Misimović goal.

Honours
Bayern Munich II
Regionalliga: 2003–04

Bayern Munich
Bundesliga: 2002–03

VfL Bochum
2. Bundesliga: 2005–06

VfL Wolfsburg
Bundesliga: 2008–09

Guizhou Renhe
Chinese FA Cup: 2013
Chinese Super Cup: 2014

Individual
Bosnian Footballer of the Year: 2007, 2013
Vereinigung der Vertragsfussballspieler best XI: 2008–09
Bosnian Sportsman of the Year: 2013
Regionalliga top goalscorer: 2003–04 (21 goals)
Bundesliga top assist provider: 2008–09 (20 assists)

References

External links

1982 births
Living people
FC Bayern Munich footballers
FC Bayern Munich II players
Eastern Orthodox Christians from Bosnia and Herzegovina
Citizens of Bosnia and Herzegovina through descent
Serbs of Bosnia and Herzegovina
Bosnia and Herzegovina footballers
Bosnia and Herzegovina expatriate footballers
VfL Bochum players
1. FC Nürnberg players
VfL Wolfsburg players
Galatasaray S.K. footballers
Beijing Renhe F.C. players
Chinese Super League players
China League One players
Bundesliga players
2. Bundesliga players
Süper Lig players
Footballers from Munich
Expatriate footballers in Germany
Expatriate footballers in Turkey
Bosnia and Herzegovina international footballers
Expatriate footballers in Russia
Expatriate footballers in China
Russian Premier League players
FC Dynamo Moscow players
2014 FIFA World Cup players
Association football midfielders